Milton Antonio Meléndez Cornejo (born 3 August 1967) is a former Salvadoran professional football player.
Wife: Marisol Perez
Sons: Tatiana Melendez, Pamela Melendez y Milton Melendez

Club career
Nicknamed El Tigana, Meléndez played the majority of his career at Alianza, club where he played until 2000.

With Alianza, Meléndez won the Apertura 1998 final against Luis Ángel Firpo.

Coaching career
After he retired from playing, he became a manager.

Coca-Cola
In 2003, Meléndez signed as new coach of Coca-Cola.

Alianza
In 2005, Meléndez signed as assistant coach of Alianza FC. Oscar del Solar was the head coach.

Chalatenango
In 2009, Meléndez signed as assistant coach of Chalatenango.

Return to Chalatenango
In 2009, Mélendez signed as new coach of Chalatenango, replacing Carlos Antonio Meléndez. However, Mélendez left the club that same year.

Brasilia
In 2010, Mélendez signed as new coach of Brasilia of Segunda División, replacing William Renderos Iraheta.

Second return to Alianza
In February 2015, Meléndez signed as new director of football of Alianza.

In February 2016, sport director Milton Meléndez and assistant coach Juan Carlos Serrano were confirmed as interim managers of Alianza, replacing Rubén Alonso. Both were later replaced by Daniel Fernández.

Third return to Alianza
In August 2016, Meléndez signed as coach of Alianza for the rest of the Apertura 2016 tournament, replacing Daniel Fernández. Meléndez led them to the final of that tournament, but they were defeated by Santa Tecla FC at the Estadio Cuscatlán (2–3). In December 2016, Meléndez was replaced by Jorge Rodríguez.

International career
Meléndez made his debut for El Salvador in 1988 and has earned over 25 caps, scoring at least 3 goals. He has represented his country in 6 FIFA World Cup qualification matches and played at the 1993 UNCAF Nations Cup. He also was a non-playing squad member at the 1996 CONCACAF Gold Cup.

His final international game was an October 1996 friendly match against Honduras.

Honours

Manager

Club
Alianza F.C.
 Primera División
 Runners-up: Apertura 2016

References

External links
 Milton Meléndez at Soccerway

External links

1967 births
Living people
Sportspeople from San Salvador
Association football midfielders
Salvadoran footballers
El Salvador international footballers
1996 CONCACAF Gold Cup players
Alianza F.C. footballers
Salvadoran football managers